Filipe Bem Relvas Vitó Oliveira (born 20 September 1999), known as Relvas, is a Portuguese professional footballer who plays for Portimonense S.C. as a central defender or a left-back.

Club career
Relvas was born in Espinho, Aveiro District. He played youth football with S.C. Espinho and C.D. Feirense, and made his senior debut in the lower leagues with Gondomar S.C. and F.C. Pedras Rubras.

In the summer of 2020, Relvas moved straight to the Primeira Liga after joining Portimonense SC, being initially assigned to the under-23 team. After signing a professional contract on 29 July 2021, he made his competitive debut for the main squad on 1 August, featuring the entire 2–0 away loss against Boavista F.C. in the second round of the Taça da Liga. His maiden league appearance took place one week later, when he also started the 1–0 win at Vitória de Guimarães.

References

External links

1999 births
Living people
People from Espinho, Portugal
Sportspeople from Aveiro District
Portuguese footballers
Association football defenders
Primeira Liga players
Campeonato de Portugal (league) players
S.C. Espinho players
C.D. Feirense players
Gondomar S.C. players
F.C. Pedras Rubras players
Portimonense S.C. players